The first season of Teenage Mutant Ninja Turtles aired on Nickelodeon from September 28, 2012, to August 8, 2013. The season introduces the four turtles Leonardo (voiced by Jason Biggs), Donatello (voiced by Rob Paulsen), Raphael (voiced by Sean Astin) and Michelangelo (voiced by Greg Cipes).

Plot
The story starts with the turtles (Leonardo, Raphael, Donatello and Michelangelo) leaving their lair for the first time, and they immediately come into conflict with the Kraang, an alien race who are kidnapping April O'Neil and her father Kirby, with Donatello developing a crush on the former, they are unable to stop the Kraang. In order to work well as a team, Splinter chooses Leonardo as their leader, they are able to save April but not Kirby and become friends regardless. Their first encounter with the Kraang leads the Shredder to discovering his old enemy's hideout.

During the course of the story, the turtles learn more about the history between Splinter and the Shredder, that they were like brothers but their love for Tang Shen caused them to become enemies and the latter accidentally killed Tang Shen. The turtles meet Leatherhead, a mutant alligator who becomes an ally. The turtles are usually thwarting Kraang, the Foot or mutants created by the mutagen, the turtles also meet Karai, Shredder's adopted daughter who is not as hostile as the rest of the Foot with them until they betray her to take Shredder out.

The turtles eventually meet Kraang Prime, the Kraang's hive mind who using Technodrome tries to invade Earth but is thwarted, Splinter also faces Shredder for the first time after many years and learns that Karai is actually Miwa, his daughter.

Production
On October 21, 2009, a press release was made indicating that Viacom had bought the complete rights of the Teenage Mutant Ninja Turtles franchise from Peter Laird for $60 million. Viacom would be developing a CGI animated TV series for its Nickelodeon family of channels for broadcast in 2012. A feature film was released by Paramount Pictures, which is also a division of Viacom in 2014.

Jason Biggs voices Leonardo and Rob Paulsen voices Donatello. In June 2011, it was confirmed that Sean Astin is playing Raphael and Greg Cipes is Michelangelo. In August 2011, it was revealed that Mae Whitman would be the voice for April O'Neil. In April 2012, it was announced that Phil LaMarr would be playing the role of Baxter Stockman and Nolan North would be playing a race of aliens known as the Kraang, while Roseanne Barr was confirmed to voice their leader, Kraang Prime. Actress Kelly Hu confirmed her role as Karai in May 2012.

Production art was leaked on the Nickelodeon website before it was taken down. The images showed the designs of all four Turtles, Shredder, Splinter, a teenage April O'Neil and the Kraang, an alien race that combines elements of both Krang and the Utroms. A trailer for the series was released on June 21, 2012, on Nickelodeon USA.

Episodes

References

External links

 Official Website Teenage Mutant Ninja Turtles

1
2012 American television seasons
2013 American television seasons
Television episodes about alien invasion